Harry William Hull Jr. (August 4, 1940 – May 3, 2020) was an American football defensive end who played in the American Football League for the Dallas Texans in 1962.

Career
Hull played college football at Wake Forest and was selected by the National Football League's Chicago Bears in the 3rd round (35th overall) of the 1962 NFL Draft and the AFL's  Boston Patriots in the 5th round (38th overall) of the 1962 AFL Draft but did not play for either team. He played only one season professionally with the AFL's Dallas Texans. He intercepted George Blanda late in the first overtime of professional football's longest championship game.  In that 1962 American Football League Championship game against the Houston Oilers, Hull's interception allowed the Texans to start the second overtime with two runs by Jack Spikes to move the ball to the Oilers' 25-yard line, and Tommy Brooker kicked a field goal to give the Texans the win, 20 - 17.

Basketball
Hull was also a collegiate basketball player, and became the first ACC player to ever to start for both the football and basketball team in the same season.

Awards
In 1992, Hull was inducted into the Wake Forest Athletics Hall of fame.

Death
He died on May 3, 2020, in Raleigh, North Carolina at age 79.

See also
Wake Forest Hall of Fame honorees

References

1940 births
2020 deaths
American football defensive ends
Wake Forest Demon Deacons football players
Dallas Texans (AFL) players